A total solar eclipse will occur on November 25, 2049. It is a hybrid event, with only a fraction of its path as total, and longer sections at the start and end as an annular eclipse. A solar eclipse occurs when the Moon passes between Earth and the Sun, thereby totally or partly obscuring the image of the Sun for a viewer on Earth. An annular solar eclipse occurs when the Moon's apparent diameter is smaller than the Sun's, blocking most of the Sun's light and causing the Sun to look like an annulus (ring). An annular eclipse appears as a partial eclipse over a region of the Earth thousands of kilometres wide.

Images 
Animated path

Related eclipses

Solar eclipses 2047–2050

Saros 143

Metonic series

Notes

References

2049 11 25
2049 in science
2049 11 25
2049 11 25